Antoine Barthélemy Jean Guillemot (11 November 1822, Thiers – 25 August 1902, Thiers) was a French entomologist .

He wrote Catalogue des lépidoptères du Département du Puy-de-Dôme Clermont-Ferrand, Impr. de Thibaud-Landriot published in 1854 online at BHL
Antoine Guillemot was a member of the Société entomologique de France.

References

Charles Oberthür, 1904 Etudes de lépidoptérologie comparée Impr. Oberthür in Rennes .

French lepidopterists
1822 births
1878 deaths